Sun News may refer to:

The Sun News, a daily newspaper published in Myrtle Beach, South Carolina
Sun News (Indian TV channel), a 24-hour Tamil news channel
Sun News Network, a defunct Canadian television news channel
Sun Newspapers, a chain of weekly newspapers in Ohio
Sun Media, a defunct Canadian newspaper chain
Sun (newspaper), various newspapers